John Wale Hicks FRCP was an Anglican bishop, educationalist and author in the second half of the nineteenth century. He was identified with the Anglo-Catholic tradition of Anglicanism.

Life
He was born in 1840 and studied at the University of London and at St Thomas's Hospital before entering Sidney Sussex College, Cambridge in 1866. Ordained in 1871, his first post was a curacy at Little St Mary’s, Cambridge. A multi-disciplinary scientist, he was elected a fellow of Sidney Sussex College in 1874, where he published "books on both doctrine and inorganic chemistry". He was later elected Dean of Sidney Sussex and in 1892 chosen to succeed George Wyndham Knight-Bruce as Bishop of Bloemfontein, a post he held until his death on 12 October 1899. There is a memorial window to him in Clawton parish church.

Works
A Text-Book of Inorganic Chemistry, 1877
The Christian Doctrine of the Godhead, 1886
The Doctrine of Absolution, 1889
The Fall and Restoration of Man, 1893

External links
Perfect in the Day of Christ: The Sermon Preached at St. Cuthbert's, Earl's Court, on the Eve of All Souls' Day, Thursday, November 1st, 1888, by John Wale Hicks

References

1840 births
Alumni of the University of London
Fellows of Sidney Sussex College, Cambridge
English scientists
Fellows of the Royal College of Physicians
19th-century Anglican Church of Southern Africa bishops
Anglo-Catholic bishops
Anglican bishops of Bloemfontein
1899 deaths
English Anglo-Catholics
British emigrants to South Africa